José Francisco Calí Tzay (born 27 September 1961) is a Guatemalan lawyer and diplomat.

He will assume the post of UN Human Rights Council Special Rapporteur on the Rights of Indigenous Peoples from 2021, after the tenure of current Special Rapporteur on the Rights of Indigenous Peoples, Victoria Tauli-Corpuz ends in 2020. As UN special rapporteur, he is tasked to investigate alleged violations of indigenous peoples rights and promote the implementation of international standards concerning the rights of indigenous peoples. In this capacity, he and David R. Boyd urged Sweden in early 2022 not to award a license to British company Beowulf Mining for the iron-ore Kallak mine in the Gallok region, home of the indigenous Sámi people, saying the open-pit mine would endanger the protected ecosystem and reindeer migration.

References

Guatemalan diplomats
1961 births
Guatemalan Maya people
Guatemalan officials of the United Nations
21st-century Guatemalan lawyers
Kaqchikel
People from Chimaltenango Department
20th-century Guatemalan lawyers
Living people